Adolfo's catfish (Corydoras adolfoi) is a tropical freshwater fish belonging to the Corydoradinae sub-family of the family Callichthyidae. It originates in inland waters in South America, and is found in the Rio Negro basin in Brazil.  It is also known as Adolfo's cory.

The fish will grow in length up to 2.2 inches (5.7 centimeters). It feeds on worms, benthic crustaceans, insects, and plant matter. Data from a wild locality show temperature , very low pH (5,3-5,4) and conductivity 7,0-8,3 microSiemens.

This species is not very easy to breed in aquarium. The fish spawn in open water and 1-2 large (ca. 2 mm in diameter), sticky eggs are attached to a plant or stone. Adults do not guard the eggs. The number of eggs is relatively small (several tens per spawn from one female). The optimal water chemistry for the development of eggs varies from author to author and it may thus depend on the origin of the fish population. At 26 °C the fry hatch after four days and start to eat after another four days. Raising the fry may not be fully trouble-free, however.

Etymology
The fish is named in honor of aquarium-fish collector and exporter Adolfo Schwartz.

See also
List of freshwater aquarium fish species

References

External links 
 

Corydoras
Taxa named by Warren E. Burgess
Fish described in 1982